This was the first edition of the tournament.

Sofya Lansere and Kamilla Rakhimova won the title, defeating Anastasia Gasanova and Valeriya Strakhova in the final, 4–6, 6–4, [10–3].

Seeds

Draw

Draw

References
Main Draw

Meitar Open - Doubles